IMAGINARY is an open platform dedicated to the communication of modern mathematics. With over 100 different exhibits, software, films, texts, and images for free use and editing, IMAGINARY connects users from over 50 countries. Science museums such as the German Museum in Munich or the Museum of Mathematics (MoMath) in New York have some of the exhibits in their collections. IMAGINARY also acted as an independent organizer of exhibitions.

History 
IMAGINARY was founded at the Mathematisches Forschungsinstitut Oberwolfach (MFO) in 2007 by Gert-Martin Greuel and Andreas Matt with an exhibition of the same name, supported by Klaus Tschira Foundation.

In 2013 Gert-Martin Greuel and Andreas Matt received the Media Prize Mathematics of the German Mathematicians Association for IMAGINARY.

From 2019 to 2019, IMAGINARY was funded by the Leibniz Association as an impetus to found a non-profit organisation. Since September 2017, IMAGINARY has been independent with an office in Berlin and regional representatives in numerous countries such as Spain, Uruguay, France, Turkey, South Korea, and China.

Exhibitions

IMAGINARY - Through the eyes of mathematics 2007 
The IMAGINARY exhibition aimed to convey abstract mathematics through images and visualizations. In the Surfer exhibit, a real-time ray tracer for generating algebraic surfaces, users can enter and edit polynomial equations with three variables, as well as rotate and color the resulting surfaces. Together with the science magazine Spectrum, a competition was created at the MFO to promote the creation of artistic images made in Surfer.

MPE - Mathematics of Planet Earth 
As part of the theme year “Mathematics of Planet Earth”, announced by UNESCO, the International Science Council ICSU and the International Council for Applied Mathematics ICIAM, IMAGINARY organized a competition on the topic. The best submissions were part of an exhibition in the German Museum of Technology in Berlin. These included an interactive simulation from the University of Freiburg that calculates the movements of ash clouds, and an exhibit from the Free University of Berlin that introduces the scientific prognosis of glacier changes.

La La Lab - The Mathematics of Music 
The La La Lab exhibition was opened in 2019 in cooperation with the Heidelberg Laureate Forum Foundation in the Mathematik-Informatik-Station (MAINS) and communicates the research results from mathematics and music. The 20 interactive stations include, among others, an exhibit using a 3D printer, art objects, laser installation.

I AM A.I. 2020/2021 
The I.AM.AI exhibition was created in 2020 with the financial support of the Carl Zeiss Foundation with the aim of communicating current AI research to a general audience. Due to the corona pandemic, I.AM.AI initially celebrated its launch as a virtual exhibition. The physical exhibition has been postponed to the year 2021 and will visit three venues with the Friedrich Schiller University Jena, the Heidelberg Laureate Forum, and a not yet announced location in Kaiserslautern.

Exhibition venues of the original IMAGINARY exhibition 
A complete list of the exhibitions, past, current and future, can be found on the official website.

Other projects and cooperations 

 since 2010 MiMa - Museum for Minerals and Mathematics
 since 2014 Mathematics Communication Network
 2015 Snapshots of Mathematics
 2015 - 2019 Hilbert
 2016 Mathematikon
 2016 - 2017 MathCreations
 2016 - 2019 Holo-Math
 2017 - 2019 TROP ICSU
 2018 Science Spaces
 2018 STEAM HUB
 2018 Imaginary, Conference IC18
 2018 - 2021 Mathina
 since 2018 Women of Mathematics throughout Europe
 since 2020 UNESCO International Day of Mathematics

References

External links 
 Official website
 Mathematischen Forschungsinstituts Oberwolfach

Mathematics museums